Liberty Tower may refer to:
 Liberty Tower (Melbourne), Australia
 Liberty Tower (Manhattan) , New York
 Liberty Tower (Dayton), Ohio
 Liberty Tower (South Bend), Indiana
 Liberty Tower (Tulsa), Oklahoma
 Liberty Tower (Warsaw), a proposed skyscraper in Warsaw

See also
 Liberty Memorial, Kansas City, Missouri
 Liberty Towers (Jersey City), New Jersey
 Liberty Towers (Tulsa), Oklahoma